Buctouche 16 is a Mi'kmaq reserve in Canada located in Kent County, New Brunswick.

Its population in the 2016 Census was 96.

Demographics

Population trend

Mother tongue (2016)

History

Notable people

See also
List of communities in New Brunswick
List of Indian reserves in Canada

References

Indian reserves in New Brunswick
Communities in Kent County, New Brunswick
Mi'kmaq in Canada